In combinatorics, a branch of mathematics, partition regularity is one notion of largeness for a collection of sets.

Given a set , a collection of subsets  is  called partition regular if every set A in the collection has the property that, no matter how A is partitioned into finitely many subsets, at least one of the subsets will also belong to the collection. That is,
Ramsey theory is sometimes characterized as the study of which collections  are partition regular.

Examples 
 The collection of all infinite subsets of an infinite set X is a prototypical example.  In this case partition regularity asserts that every finite partition of an infinite set has an infinite cell (i.e. the infinite pigeonhole principle.)
 For any ultrafilter  on a set ,  is partition regular: for any , if , then exactly one .
 Call a subset of natural numbers a.p.-rich if it contains arbitrarily long arithmetic progressions. Then the collection of a.p.-rich subsets is partition regular (Van der Waerden, 1927).
Let . For each n,  is partition regular. (Ramsey, 1930).
 The collection of -sets:  is a -set if  contains the set of differences  for some sequence .
 The set of barriers on : call a collection  of finite subsets of  a barrier if:
  and
 This generalizes Ramsey's theorem, as each  is a barrier. (Nash-Williams, 1965)

 Finite products of infinite trees (Halpern–Läuchli, 1966)
 Piecewise syndetic sets (Brown, 1968)
 Call a subset of natural numbers i.p.-rich if it contains arbitrarily large finite sets together with all their finite sums. Then the collection of i.p.-rich subsets is partition regular (Folkman–Rado–Sanders, 1968).
 (m, p, c)-sets  (Deuber, 1973)
 IP sets (Hindman, 1974, see also Hindman, Strauss, 1998)
 MTk sets for each k, i.e. k-tuples of finite sums (Milliken–Taylor, 1975)
(Furstenberg, 1981, see also Hindman, Strauss, 1998)

Diophantine equations 
A Diophantine equation  is called partition regular if the collection of all infinite subsets of  containing a solution is partition regular. Rado's theorem characterises exactly which systems of linear Diophantine equations  are partition regular. Much progress has been made recently on classifying nonlinear Diophantine equations.

References

Sources 
 Vitaly Bergelson, N. Hindman Partition regular structures contained in large sets are abundant  J. Comb. Theory A 93 (2001), 18–36.
 T. Brown, An interesting combinatorial method in the theory of locally finite semigroups, Pacific J. Math.  36, no. 2 (1971), 285–289.
 W. Deuber, Mathematische Zeitschrift 133, (1973) 109–123
 N. Hindman, Finite sums from sequences within cells of a partition of N, J. Comb. Theory A 17 (1974) 1–11.
 C.St.J.A. Nash-Williams, On well-quasi-ordering transfinite sequences, Proc. Camb. Phil. Soc. 61 (1965), 33–39.
 N. Hindman, D. Strauss, Algebra in the Stone–Čech compactification, De Gruyter, 1998
 J.Sanders, A Generalization of Schur's Theorem, Doctoral Dissertation, Yale University, 1968.

Ramsey theory
Families of sets